Rande Lazar is an otolaryngologist with a primary focus in pediatric ear, nose, and throat disorders. He has special expertise in adult and pediatric sleep and snoring disorders and surgery, as well as adult and pediatric sinus disorders.

Education and certification 
Lazar received his B.A. in 1973 from Brooklyn College, Brooklyn, NY, and his M.D. in 1978 from Universidad Autonoma de Guadalajara, Guadalajara, Jalisco, Mexico. He was a resident at the Department of General Surgery, Cornell-North Shore University Hospital, Manhasset, New York and the Cleveland Clinic Foundation, Cleveland, Ohio, where he became Chief 
Resident in the Department of Otolaryngology and Communicative Disorders. He was licensed in 1985 by the State of Tennessee and obtained certification in 1984 from the American Board of Otolaryngology for Head and Neck Surgery and in 2005 from the American Board of Disability Analysts.

Scholarships and community giving 
Lazar has established several scholarships to aid medical students in their study of medicine and otolaryngology, awarded by Brooklyn College, Mississippi State University College of Veterinary Medicine, Cleveland Clinic Foundation, and the American Academy of Otolaryngology, Head & Neck Surgery.

Peer-reviewed publications
He has 46 peer-reviewed publication listed in Scopus. The 5 most highly cited are
  Cited 53 times.
  Cited 51 times.
  Cited 47 times.
  Cited 46 times.
  Cited 45 times.

Overall, a total 18 of his papers have been cited 18 times of more and his h-index is therefore 18.

Honors and awards
 Award of Honor, The Academy of Otolaryngology–Head and Neck Surgery, September, 1991
 Physician Recognition Award, American Medical Association
 Rande H. Lazar, M.D. Cleveland Clinic Lectureship

Hospital affiliations 
Lazar has been Director of Pediatric Otolaryngology Fellowship Training, ENT Memphis at LeBonheur Children's Medical Center from 1989 to the present, and has been affiliated as Chief of Surgery, chairman, or Chief of Staff with LeBonheur Children's Medical Center, Department of Otolaryngology Head and Neck Surgery, Methodist Health Systems, Les Passees Children's Rehabilitation Center, and LeBonheur Children's Medical Center-East Surgery Center, Memphis, TN. He has been a member of the Medical Advisory Committee, LeBonheur East, from 1990 to the present.

External links 
 Homepage of Lazar's practice
 Lazar's blog

Notes

Living people
American otolaryngologists
Year of birth missing (living people)
Brooklyn College alumni